Ottawa Township may refer to:

 Ottawa Township, LaSalle County, Illinois
 Ottawa Township, Franklin County, Kansas
 Ottawa Township, Ottawa County, Kansas, in Ottawa County, Kansas
 Ottawa Township, Le Sueur County, Minnesota
 Ottawa Township, Allen County, Ohio
 Ottawa Township, Putnam County, Ohio

Township name disambiguation pages